Diego Adán Morales (born December 11, 1979 in Tijuana, Mexico) is a Mexican former professional boxer who held the WBO super flyweight title in 1999. He is the younger sibling of Érik Morales.

Professional boxing record

See also
Notable boxing families
List of Mexican boxing world champions

External links 
 

Living people
1979 births
Mexican male boxers
Bantamweight boxers
Flyweight boxers
Super-flyweight boxers
Super-bantamweight boxers
Lightweight boxers
Southpaw boxers
World Boxing Organization champions
World super-flyweight boxing champions
Boxers from Baja California
Sportspeople from Tijuana